The Centerfield School and Meetinghouse, also known as the Centerfield Rock Church is a historic structure located at 140 S. Main St. in Centerfield, Utah. Built between 1886 and 1889, it was listed on the National Register of Historic Places in 2000.

It is a one-story oolitic limestone building, built by stonemasons Chris Tollstrup and Gustav Nielsen. A mansard roof on the east portion of the building was added in 1897 to give it Second Empire style.

References

External links

Schools in Utah
National Register of Historic Places in Sanpete County, Utah
Second Empire architecture in Utah
Buildings and structures completed in 1886